The Neptune Herring Oil Factory is a former industry in the town of Melbu in Norway's Vesterålen district. It has been given cultural heritage status.

The factory was set up in 1910. For a long time, production was based on herring. When herring was no longer available as raw material, the factory switched to using capelin. In the 1980s, the supply of this fish as raw material also failed, and the factory shut down in 1987. All of its equipment was sold to Morocco.

During the 1900s there were many factories of this type in the Norwegian fisheries, and few of them are preserved today. Many of them, like the Neptune factory, were established at the beginning of the century and were shut down in the 1980s. The Neptune Herring Oil Factory was added to the list of priority technical and industrial cultural heritage by the Norwegian Directorate for Cultural Heritage. This list comprises several facilities of different types, and it is based on extensive registration work. The conservation of the factory in Melbu focuses on preserving herring oil factories.

Starting in 1991, the buildings were managed as part of the Norwegian Fishing Industry Museum, which was established in the spring of 1991. The Norwegian Fishing Industry Museum offers nationwide coverage of its field and has a national function.

References

Further reading
Inger Anne Hovland. 2002. Havets sølv som ble Melbus gull. Museumsnytt: 5-6.

External links
 Neptune Herring Oil Factory at kulturminnesok.no
 Neptune Herring Oil Factory at the Norwegian Directorate for Cultural Heritage website
 Neptune Herring Oil Factory at the Norwegian Museum of Science and Technology website

Hadsel
Cultural heritage of Norway
Defunct companies of Norway
Norwegian companies established in 1910
Companies disestablished in 1987
Food and drink companies established in 1910
Food and drink companies of Norway
1987 disestablishments in Norway